Karin Elisabeth Lundgren (née Wallgren on 19 May 1944) is a retired Swedish sprinter. She competed at the 1968 and 1972 Summer Olympics in various 100–400 m events (five in total), but failed to reach the finals. She won the 400 m contest at the 1967 European Indoor Games, and placed fifth at the 1969 European Athletics Championships and fourth at the 1971 European Athletics Indoor Championships.

Wallgren-Lundgren won the national championships in the 100 m (1966 and 1968–71), 200 m (1962, 1965–66, 1968–70 and 1972), 400 m (1966 and 1968–72), and various relays (24 times). She held national records over 100 m, 200 m and 400 m. After retiring from competitions she was deputy chairman in Swedish Athletics Association.

References

1944 births
Living people
Swedish female sprinters
Olympic athletes of Sweden
Athletes (track and field) at the 1968 Summer Olympics
Athletes (track and field) at the 1972 Summer Olympics
Olympic female sprinters
Athletes from Gothenburg